Chris Busby may refer to:
 Christopher Busby, British scientist
 Chris Busby (referee)